Badulla Pillar Inscription is an archaeological stone inscription, which is currently located at the Senarath Paranavithana Memorial Library of Badulla, Sri Lanka. It contains 203 lines and about 2,000 mediaeval Sinhala scripts. The Badulla inscript is considered to be the largest pillar inscription, with the smallest letters, found in the country.

Content
The pillar inscription was created during the reign of King Udaya IV. It was recorded that the trade had been practiced in the market town of Hopitigama. According to the inscription, the traders and the householders of Hopitigama had submitted a petition outlining corruption and bribes done by village chief, to King Udaya when he visited the Mahiyangana pagoda. After a probe the stone pillar was erected on the orders of the king, which published the rules prohibiting these illegal activities.

Additionally the inscription reveals that in those days the scales had been used to measure grain and bulls had been used for the transportation of goods.

Location
The Badulla Pillar Inscription was found in 1857 by Jone Belli, the British deputy agent for Badulla. Initially it was placed at the Kachcheri in Badulla, but due to concerns about its conservation the pillar inscription was relocated to its current position at the Badulla public library.

See also
 Stone inscriptions in Sri Lanka

References

Sri Lanka inscriptions
Anuradhapura period
Archaeological protected monuments in Badulla District